Futbolo centras Pakruojis, commonly known as Pakruojis, was a Lithuanian football club located in Pakruojis, center of Pakruojis District.

History
Club was created in January 2016 after the dissolution of another Pakruojis-based club, Kruoja. Despite publicly denying any links with Kruoja, club attracted many of their footballers and also former Kruoja head coach Aidas Dambrauskas. They played in 2016 Žemaitijos Taurė, but remained last in A Lyga. Team was hoping to compete in the 2016 LFF I Lyga, but failed to obtain I Lyga license and played in II Lyga West zone instead. They won the competition by 13 points margin and secured promotion to I Lyga.

Before the start of the 2017 season the club once again competed in the Žemaitijos Taurė, where this time they finished second, losing to hosts Džiugas 3–0 in the final. Club started their league campaign really well and even managed to climb to the top of the league after 14 rounds, but soon after had a winless streak of 6 games and didn't recover, finally ending the season in 9th place.

In the 2018 LFF I Lyga season, after the first half of the championship, the team was in second position, but after parting with several players in the transfer window lost match after match and eventually finished in seventh position.

In 2019 LFF I Lyga season FC Pakruojis struggled, and after 19 game losing streak finished last in the league, and were relegated. They have conceded 63 goals in their last 6 games. 

In 2020 they defunct and not played in any competitions.

Stadium

Club play their home matches in Pakruojis Stadium. The current capacity of the stadium is 2,000 seats.

Honours
The club's honours:
 II Lyga West Zone
 Winners: 2016

Recent seasons
The recent season-by-season performance of the club:

References

 
Football clubs in Pakruojis
Defunct football clubs in Lithuania
2016 establishments in Lithuania
Association football clubs established in 2016
Association football clubs disestablished in 2019
2019 disestablishments in Lithuania